The 1901 Kentucky University Pioneers football team was an American football team that represented Kentucky University, now known as Transylvania University, during the 1901 college football season. Hogan Yancey was on the team.

Schedule

References

Kentucky University
Transylvania Pioneers football seasons
Kentucky University football